Eutropis madaraszi, also known commonly as the Sri Lanka bronze mabuya, the Sri Lanka bronze skink, or (ambiguously) the spotted skink, is a species of lizard in the family Scincidae. The species is endemic to the island of Sri Lanka.

Etymology
The specific name, madaraszi, is in honor of Hungarian ornithologist Gyula Madarász of the Hungarian National Museum.

Habitat and distribution
A widespread terrestrial skink, E. madaraszi has been reported from both wet and dry zones. Known localities include Colombo, as well as around Kala Wewa, and Madatugama.

Description
The body of E. madaraszi is slender, with 32 midbody scale rows. The dorsum is brown, with a dark line along the flank. The venter is creamy and unpatterned.

Ecology and diet

References

Further reading
Das I (1996). Biogeography of the Reptiles of South Asia. Malabar, Florida: Krieger Publishing Company. 87 pp. . (Mabuya madaraszi, new combination).
Méhelÿ L (1897). "Zur Herpetologie von Ceylon ". Termes Fuzetek, Budapest 20: 55–70. (Mabuia madaraszi, new species, p. 59). (in German).
Ziesmann S, Klaas P, Janzen P (2007). "Von Skinken und anderen Echsen [Sri Lankas] ". Draco 7 (30): 18–23. (Eutropis madaraszi, new combination). (in German).

External links
 http://biodiversityofsrilanka.blogspot.com/2014/03/spotted-skink-eutropis-madaraszi.html (photo of Eutropis madaraszi).
 Das I, De Silva A, Austin CC (2008). "A new skink found from Sri Lanka". Zootaxa 1700: 35–52. (Eutropis tammanna, new species).

Lygosominae
Endemic fauna of Sri Lanka
Reptiles of Sri Lanka
Reptiles described in 1897
Taxa named by Lajos Méhelÿ